The American College of Nurse-Midwives (ACNM) is a professional association in the United States, formed in 1955, that represents certified nurse-midwives (CNMs) and certified midwives (CMs). Dating back to 1929, ACNM is the leading example for excellence in midwifery education and practice in the United States and has a special interest in promoting global health in developing countries. "Our members are primary care providers for women throughout the lifespan, with a special emphasis on pregnancy, childbirth, and gynecologic and reproductive health. ACNM reviews research, administers and promotes continuing education programs, and works with organizations, state and federal agencies, and members of Congress to advance the well-being of women and infants through the practice of midwifery."

ACNM publishes the Journal of Midwifery & Women's Health.

The A.C.N.M. Foundation
The A.C.N.M. Foundation, Inc., a tax-exempt 501 (c)(3) nonprofit charitable organization, was incorporated in 1967. As the philanthropic arm of the American College of Nurse-Midwives (ACNM), it was created with the mission to promote exemplary health care for women, newborns, and families all around the world through the support of midwifery. The Foundation and ACNM work closely to promote the common goal of "supporting midwifery education, research, practice, and leadership activities that advance the provision of high quality maternal, newborn, and well-woman health care services."

Notable presidents
 Elizabeth Sharp, 1973-75

See also
 Childbirth
 Doula
 Nurse practitioner
 Nursing
 Obstetrical nursing
 Midwife

References

External links

1955 establishments in the United States
Healthcare accreditation organizations in the United States
Midwifery in the United States
Midwifery organizations